Klugmann is a German surname. Notable people with the surname include:

Adolf Klügmann (1837–1880), German classical archaeologist and numismatist
James Klugmann, (1912–1977), British Communist writer
Joe Klugmann (1895-1951), professional baseball player

See also
Klugman

German-language surnames
Jewish surnames